Ribes menziesii, the canyon gooseberry, is a species of currant found only in California and Oregon. There are five to six varieties of the species found across the low elevation mountains of California, especially the Coast Ranges, and the coastal canyons and foothills, into southern Oregon. It can be found in the chaparral plant community.

Description
It has somewhat rounded, hairy, glandular green leaves.

Its showy hanging flowers have sepals which are reflexed, or folded backwards along the length of the flower. The sepals are fuchsia or purple. The petals are white and extend forward to form a loose tube from which the stamens emerge.

The plant fruits purple gooseberries which are edible but are mainly seeds with little fruit, generally regarded as unpalatable. The plant's spines also make collecting fruit difficult.

Varieties
Ribes menziesii var. ixoderme — southern Sierra Nevada. Calflora taxon report, University of California: Ribes menziesii var. ixoderme
Ribes menziesii var. menziesii —  Coast ranges.
Ribes menziesii var. senile (Coville) Jeps. - Santa Cruz County

Cultivation
Ribes menziesii is cultivated as an ornamental plant for native plant and wildlife gardens, in areas of suitable climate, such as coastal California. It is valued for its attractive spring blooms.

References

External links

Jepson Manual Treatment: Ribes menziesii
Ribes menziesii — Calphotos Photo Gallery, University of California

menziesii
Flora of California
Flora of Oregon
Garden plants of North America
Plants described in 1813
Flora without expected TNC conservation status